Thompson Street is the third solo album by American country music singer Brady Seals. It was released in February 2003 via Image Entertainment. No singles were released from it, and after its release, Seals founded the band Hot Apple Pie.

Track listing
"Thompson Street" (Brady Seals, Kizzy Plush) – 4:24
"Things Have Gotta Change" (Seals, Rodney Crowell) – 3:23
"Soon" (Seals, Crowell) – 3:52
"Breakin' Down" (Seals) – 3:28
"Free Love" (Greg McDowell, Seals) – 3:45
"Let Me Be Your Man" (Seals, Lisa Stewart) – 3:14
"All I Want" (Seals, McDowell, Joe Rock) – 3:40
"That's How It Goes" (McDowell, Seals, Andy Sturmer) – 3:30
"10 9 8 7 6 5 4 3 2 1" (Seals) – 3:22
"Our Last Goodbye" (Seals, Sturmer) – 3:29

Personnel
 Pat Buchanan - electric guitar
 John Catchings - cello
 Rodney Crowell - acoustic guitar
 David Davidson - violin
 Tommy Harden - drums
 Porter Howell- electric guitar
 Greg McDowell - electric guitar, background vocals
 Rob McNelley - electric guitar
 Mark Matejka - acoustic guitar
 Michael Rhodes - bass guitar
 John Lee Sanders - penny whistle
 Dave Santos - bass guitar
 Brady Seals - drum programming, acoustic guitar, keyboards, mellotron, Hammond organ, piano, Wurlitzer, lead vocals, background vocals
 Steuart Smith - electric guitar, keyboards
 Lisa Stewart - background vocals
 Andy Sturmer - acoustic guitar, background vocals
 Kris Wilkinson - string arrangements, viola

References
Allmusic

2003 albums
Brady Seals albums
Image Entertainment albums